Prológica Indústria e Comércio de Mircrocomputadores, commonly shortened to Prológica, was an influential Brazilian microcomputer company that reached its peak in the mid-1980s, when it ranked third among national companies in the sector.

History 
Founded in 1976, the company initially commercialized machines for accounting use, namely the MCA-100 and Alpha Disk. The first models had an Intel 8080 processor, and in the early months the company even managed to get a partnership with Olivetti.

The company later specialized in producing products similar to the American TRS-80 series of microcomputers, under the general name of "CP" (for "Computador Pessoal" in Portuguese, "Personal Computer" in English).

One of its biggest successes in the professional field was the CP-500, compatible with the TRS-80 Model III.

In 1990, the company was sued by Microsoft for creating SO16 ("Sistema Operativo 16"), an operating system based on MS-DOS.

Line of products 
A not extensive list of Prológica's products:

Home computers 

NE-Z80 (Sinclair ZX80 clone)
NE-Z8000 (1982, Sinclair ZX81 clone)

CP-200 (1982, Sinclair ZX81 compatible)
CP-200S (1982, Sinclair ZX81 compatible, alternate case)
CP-300 (1983, TRS-80 Model III compatible)
CP-400 (1984, Color Computer 2 compatible)
CP-400 II (better keyboard)

Personal computers 
Sistema 600
Sistema 700 (1981, DOS-700 - CP/M-80 compatible)
CP-500 (1982, TRS-80 Model III compatible)
CP-500/M80 (1985)
CP-500/M80C (1986)
Solution 16  (1986, SO16 - MS-DOS 2.11 compatible)
CP-500 Turbo (1987, faster CPU)
SP 16
AT SP 286
AT SP 386
AT SP 486

Peripherals 
CP-450 (floppy disk drive interface) 
Printer P-500
Printer P-600
Printer P-700
Printer P-720
Printer Antares 400

References 

Electronics companies of Brazil
Defunct computer companies of Brazil
Defunct manufacturing companies of Brazil
Manufacturing companies based in São Paulo
Brazilian brands
Brazilian companies established in 1976
1995 disestablishments in Brazil
Electronics companies established in 1976
Electronics companies disestablished in 1995